Germán Serrano Pinto  (30 March 1940 – 21 May 2016) was a Costa Rican politician. He served as Vice President of Costa Rica from 1990 through 1994. He died on 21 May 2016.

References

Vice presidents of Costa Rica
1940 births
2016 deaths